Thunder Rising is a children's fantasy novel in the Warriors series by Erin Hunter. Thunder Rising is the second book in the Dawn of the Clans arc, the first being The Sun Trail. Dawn of the Clans follows a group of anthropomorphic cats as they struggle to find peace within themselves, before the rise of the five Clans in the later Warriors series, ThunderClan, RiverClan, WindClan, ShadowClan, and SkyClan. Thunder Rising follows a young cat, Thunder, as he grows up under his uncle's care after his father abandoned him. He is torn between the cat that raised him and longing for the acknowledgement of his biological father.

Plot
Thunder Rising is set a few months following the events of The Sun Trail, during which the cats who were previously part of the Tribe of Rushing Water (also referred to as the Tribe) left their mountain home during a famine when the Tribe's leader had a vision directing the cats to leave in search of food. The cats have settled into their new home in a forest. Thunder, the son of Clear Sky and Storm, a rogue cat who lived in the forest before the Tribe cats arrived, is being raised by his uncle, Gray Wing, after his mother died and his father rejected him. A forest fire rages through Clear Sky's territory, forcing him and his group to temporarily seek shelter with Gray Wing. While staying with Gray Wing, Clear Sky asks Thunder if he wants to live in the forest with him instead. Thunder accepts the offer, wanting to get to know his father, and he stays with Clear Sky for a short while. After seeing that Clear Sky is power-hungry and uncaring about the needs of his cats, Thunder leaves and returns to Gray Wing and his group.

Inspiration
Thunder Rising takes place in several locations inspired by similar locales in the United Kingdom. With the exception of a disused mine, the forest in which the cats live is based largely on New Forest.  Some other sources of inspiration for the series include the works of authors such as J. R. R. Tolkien and C. S. Lewis.

Characters
The main characters live in two groups, each led by one of two brothers: Clear Sky and Gray Wing. Clear Sky's group consists largely of cats who are adept at hunting in the undergrowth and a few who fish and swim. Gray Wing's group lives on the moor, and its members are able to run quickly, which is good for catching rabbits on the moor. Both groups are made up largely from the group of cats that traveled from the mountain where prey was scarce.

Release
Thunder Rising was released on 5 November 2013 as the second book in the Dawn of the Clans arc, which is the fifth arc of the Warriors series. It was preceded by The Sun Trail, and followed by The First Battle. A writer for Books-A-Million stated that Thunder Rising was a contributor to a strong children's and young adult's book market for fall of 2013.

Reception 
Thunder Rising received mostly positive reviews. It earned 4.42 stars on Goodreads, and 5 stars on DogoBooks.

References

Warriors (novel series)
2013 American novels
2013 children's books
Novels about cats
HarperCollins books